Joe Brooks was a footballer from Stalybridge, England. He played in the Football League for Glossop and Sheffield United, and the Southern League for Watford and Stalybridge Celtic. Early in his career, Brooks also played for his hometown's previous club, Stalybridge Rovers prior to its dissolution.

References

Year of birth missing
Year of death missing
People from Stalybridge
English footballers
Association football defenders
Southern Football League players
English Football League players
Stalybridge Rovers F.C. players
Glossop North End A.F.C. players
Watford F.C. players
Sheffield United F.C. players
Stalybridge Celtic F.C. players